Pierluigi Sangiorgi (born 7 October 1968) is an Italian former equestrian. He competed in the individual dressage event at the 2008 Summer Olympics.

References

External links
 

1968 births
Living people
Italian male equestrians
Italian dressage riders
Olympic equestrians of Italy
Equestrians at the 2008 Summer Olympics
People from Faenza
Sportspeople from the Province of Ravenna